Tommy Dassalo (born Thomas Howard Alsop) is a stand-up comedian and writer based in Melbourne, Australia. He co-hosts The Little Dum Dum Club, a comedy podcast with Karl Chandler. He also co-hosts the Filthy Casuals podcast with Ben Vernel and Adam Knox.

Early life
Dassalo was born as Thomas Alsop in 1986, and raised in the Eastern suburbs of Melbourne. He is an only child. At age nine, he was diagnosed with aplastic anemia, a rare bone marrow disease. This became the subject of his one-man stand-up show Pipsqueak in 2012.

Career
Dassalo has worked as a semi-professional stand-up comedian, a writer, and an actor.

Stand-up
Dassalo has been performing stand-up comedy since he was 13 years old. He has performed thirteen one-man shows to date at the Melbourne International Comedy Festival.

He appeared as a guest host on Episode 51 of the Weekly Planet.

Notable stand-up shows
2010 - An Explosion of Colour
2011 - Buckwild
2012 - Pipsqueak
2016 - Little Golden Dassalo
2017 - Dinner For Two
2019 - Balding Cherub

Podcasts 
In October 2010, Dassalo and Chandler began recording a weekly comedy podcast, The Little Dum Dum Club, to promote the work of fellow comedians.

He is currently the host of Filthy Casuals, a video-game themed comedy podcast, featuring Ben Vernel and Adam Knox. He previously hosted a sports podcast called You Beauty with his friend Sam Gray.

Writer credits (theatre)
2006 - I Heart Racism (with Dave Bushell)
2009 - All The Single Ladies (with Bart Freebairn)

Writer credits (television)
2009 - Talkin' 'Bout Your Generation
2014 - Fully Furnished (pilot) (with Tom Ballard)

Acting credits (television) 
 2015 - Fully Furnished (pilot)

References

External links

The Little Dum Dum Club

Living people
1986 births
Australian male comedians
Comedians from Melbourne
People from Malvern, Victoria